Silvio Pagano (born 12 September 1985) is an Italian-German footballer who most recently played for Wuppertaler SV.

References

External links

Silvio Pagano on Fupa

1985 births
Living people
German footballers
German sportspeople of Italian descent
1. FC Köln II players
FC Carl Zeiss Jena players
SC Verl players
Rot-Weiss Essen players
Wuppertaler SV players
Sportfreunde Lotte players
SC Fortuna Köln players
FC Viktoria Köln players
2. Bundesliga players
Regionalliga players
Sportspeople from Wuppertal
Association football wingers
Footballers from North Rhine-Westphalia